Yakovlev Yak-60 (known as Yak-32 in some sources) is the possible designation for an experimental Yakovlev tandem-rotor heavy-lift helicopter design of the late 1960s. This design never progressed beyond the model stage.

Development
This helicopter was designed in the late 1960s, and may have been a competing design to the Mil Mi-12 heavy lift helicopter. It featured two Mil Mi-6 rotors in tandem, each driven by a pair of  Soloviev D-25VF engines, potentially giving it four times the payload capacity of the Boeing CH-47 Chinook. The cockpit would have been similar to that of the Yakovlev Yak-24. Compared to the radical Mi-12, the Yak-60 design was far more conventional, though two Mi-12s were produced and no Yak-60s.

It has been suggested that the designation Yak-60 was based on an extant study model which had the number "60" painted prominently on its side.

Specifications (Yak-60 estimated)

See also
Yakovlev VVP-6
Mil V-12

References

1960s Soviet military transport aircraft
Yak-060
Military helicopters
Abandoned military aircraft projects of the Soviet Union
1960s Soviet helicopters